Seri Begawan may refer to:

 Bandar Seri Begawan, capital of Brunei
 Paduka Seri Begawan Sultan, a title of Omar Ali Saifuddien III, former sultan of Brunei after whom Bandar Seri Begawan was named
 Paduka Seri Begawan Sultan Science College, a school in Brunei
 Seri Begawan Religious Teachers University College, a university in Brunei
 Suri Seri Begawan Hospital, government hospital in Kuala Belait, Belait District, Brunei